Sagna is the surname of the following people
 Augustin Sagna (born 1920), Senegalese prelate
 Bacary Sagna (born 1983), French footballer
 Christian Sagna (born 1982), Senegalese footballer
 Henri Sagna (born 1973), Senegalese sculptor
 Lansana Sagna (born 1994), Senegalese football player
 Moussa Sagna Fall (born 1959), Senegalese high jumper
 Pierre Sagna (bishop) (1932-2008), a Senegalese Roman Catholic bishop
 Pierre Sagna (footballer) (born 1990), a Senegalese footballer
 Pierre Martin Sagna (born 1950), a Senegalese basketball player
 Robert Sagna (born 1939), Senegalese politician
 Saeid Agin Sagna (born 1975), Nigerian football player
 Sidy Sagna (born 1990), Senegalese footballer